This is a list of star systems within 75-80 light years of Earth.

The closest B-type star, Regulus, is in this list.

See also
Lists of stars
List of star systems within 70-75 light-years
List of nearest stars and brown dwarfs

References

star systems within 75-80 light-years
Star systems
star systems within 75-80 light-years